Whichello is a rural locality in the Toowoomba Region, Queensland, Australia.

Geography

Whichello is on the Darling Downs in southern Queensland.

Whichello is similar to many of the localities in the eastern Downs, with the land mostly cleared for agriculture and few facilities or amenities.  A  reserve is situated in Whichello School Road.

Road infrastructure
The Pechey-Maclagan Road runs through from east to south.

History 
Whichello Provisional School opened circa 1894. On 1 January 1909 it became Whichello State School. It closed circa 1941.

References

Toowoomba Region
Localities in Queensland